Zaryn may refer to:
Zaryń, Polish village
Żaryn, Polish surname
Zaryn Dentzel, founder of Tuenti Technologies
Zaryn Min (Zarynn Min) (born 1980), Malaysian actress